"Happy Summer Days" is a 1966 pop single by Ronnie Dove.

Background
The single was Dove's 10th charting single for the Diamond label.  It was the only Dove single to be released with a picture sleeve.

Chart positions 
"Happy Summer Days" peaked at number 27 on the Billboard Pop Singles chart in 1966.  It did considerably better on the Easy Listening Charts, peaking at #7. It was featured on his Ronnie Dove Sings the Hits for You album.

Popular culture
In 2019, the song was featured in an Amazon commercial.

References

1966 singles
Ronnie Dove songs
1966 songs
Songs written by Wes Farrell